Aleksey Ivanovich Slapovsky (29 July 1957 – 8 January 2023) was a Russian novelist. He was born in Saratov region, and attended the University of Saratov where he studied philology. He worked variously as a school teacher, a truck driver, and a journalist for TV and radio. Between 1990 and 1995, he worked at the magazine Volga.

Slapovsky started his literary career as a playwright in the 1980s, before switching to the novel. Noted works include Sincere Artist, Unwritten Novel (1990) and It's Not Me. He has been nominated several times for the Russian Booker Prize.

Slapovsky died from pneumonia on 8 January 2023, at the age of 65.

References

1957 births
2023 deaths
Soviet writers
20th-century Russian writers
21st-century Russian writers
Russian male novelists
People from Saratov Oblast
Russian journalists